Morawhanna is a small Atlantic coast village in Guyana, on the left side of the Barima River and in close proximity to Venezuela.

The 2012 census had a population count of 203, mostly Amerindians. It has a secondary school, with nursery and secondary departments, and a health post. Major economic activities include fishing and crab-catching.

Morawhanna was declared a port-of-entry in the mid 1950s, and developed to facilitate the export of manganese from Matthew's Ridge and Port Kaituma to Trinidad and Tobago. This was done until the early 1970s, when the manganese company closed its operations. In the 1980s, it was converted into Morawhanna fish port complex, a now-defunct plan for local fish processing. The port serves as a rest-point for ferry services.

The area suffers regular flooding from the Barima River and lacks drainage to handle it. The port sees major oil smuggling from Venezuela, which resulted in closure of a GuyOil fuel farm in the 1990s. The area also has high numbers of Venezuelan migrants.

Other villages near Morawhanna include Smith Creek and Imbotero.

References

External links 

 Morawhanna: A village once famed for its rich African cultural heritage 

Populated places in Barima-Waini